The Association Foot Ball League was a soccer league based in St. Louis, Missouri, that existed from 1890 until 1910.

History
In 1890, several St. Louis teams banded together to form a citywide league.  According to some sources, this was known as the St. Louis Soccer League, but more likely, it was known as the Association Foot Ball League. The Kensingtons were the surprise winners of the first two league titles.  Most of the Kensington players were local high school players, but the brilliant play of goalkeeper Jumbo Trimble led the team to victory.  In 1892, Blue Bells, composed mostly of Scottish railroad workers emerged as the team to beat.  In 1893, the Sodality League emerged as a rival league.  Composed of teams formed from local Roman Catholic Sodalities, this league included the first St. Teresa club.  In 1894 and 1895, the champions from both leagues played for the city title.  St. Teresa won both years.  In 1895, the Sodality League merged with the Association Foot Ball League, bringing in St. Teresa which promptly won the league title.  In 1897, violent play on the part of St. Teresa led to a one-year suspension from the league.  In 1907, the St. Louis Soccer League was established as a rival to the AFBL. In 1908, the best players in the AFBL moved to the SLSL, but the AFBL continued to operate as a lower level, amateur league until 1910.

Champions

External links
 St. Louis City Champions
 St. Louis Soccer League (SLSL) - 1907-1939

References

Soccer in St. Louis
Defunct soccer leagues in the United States